Hikmat Singh Verma (1955/1956 – 22 July 2021) was a Fiji Indian politician.

Biography
He won the Laucala Indian Communal Constituency, one of the 19 seats reserved for Fiji citizens of Indian origin, for the Fiji Labour Party during the 1999 elections for the House of Representatives.

On 19 May 2000, he was among the 44 members of the People's Coalition Government, led by Mahendra Chaudhry, taken hostage by George Speight and his band of rebel Republic of Fiji Military Forces (RFMF) soldiers from the Counter Revolutionary Warfare Unit. He was released on 13 July 2000 after 56 days of captivity.

He died at age 65 on 22 July 2021, from COVID-19 in Suva during the COVID-19 pandemic in Fiji.

References 

Fijian Hindus
Fiji Labour Party politicians
Indian members of the House of Representatives (Fiji)
1950s births
2021 deaths
Deaths from the COVID-19 pandemic in Fiji
Politicians from Nasinu
Year of birth missing